Vita ce n'è (English: "There's Life") is the fourteenth studio album by Eros Ramazzotti, released on 23 November 2018 through Polydor Records. It was also released in a Spanish version titled Hay vida. It is supported by the lead single and title track, released on 19 October with a music video directed by Marc Klasfeld and filmed in Miami. The album features collaborations with Alessia Cara and Luis Fonsi. Ramazzotti will tour in support of the album, beginning on 17 February 2019 in Munich. The tour will visit five continents.

Background
Ramazzotti revealed that the album's title "represents the mood of this historical moment [of being 55], it's a positive message".

Promotion
A preview of the video for the title track was shown on TG1 on 17 October before being released in full on 19 October.

Track listing
Adapted from Ramazzotti's Twitter.

Charts

Weekly charts

Year-end charts

Vita Ce N'è World Tour

References

2018 albums
Eros Ramazzotti albums